Yucca grandiflora Gentry is a plant in the family Asparagaceae, native to the Sierra Madre Occidental in the Mexican states of Chihuahua and Sonora.

Common names include Sahualiqui and Large-flowered Yucca. The Pima Bajo peoples of the region sometimes eat the immature fruits.

It has a wide range, although it has a very low population density where it occurs.

References

grandiflora
Flora of Chihuahua (state)
Flora of Sonora
Plants described in 1957